Irina Borzova (Russian: Ирина Борзова, born January 15, 1987) is a Russian acrobatic gymnast, world champion in acrobatic gymnastics (Glasgow, 2008) in the category «Women's team» (2008 Acrobatic Gymnastics World Championships; jointly with Tamara Turlacheva and Tatiana Baranovskaya). She also won bronze medal on the World Cup Series (May 23–24, 2008, Publier, France) in the category «Women's group» (jointly with Tamara Turlacheva and Tatiana Baranovskaya).

References

External links
 

Russian acrobatic gymnasts
Female acrobatic gymnasts
1987 births
Living people
Medalists at the Acrobatic Gymnastics World Championships
Gymnasts from Moscow
21st-century Russian women